Dieter Lindner (18 January 1937 – 13 May 2021) was an East German athlete who mainly competed in the 20 kilometre walk.

He won the silver medal for the United Team of Germany in the 20 kilometre walk at the 1964 Summer Olympics held in Tokyo and the gold medal at the 1966 European Championships in Athletics. Other achievements include a fourth place at the 1960 Summer Olympics and a sixth place at the 1962 European Championships in Athletics.

References

1937 births
2021 deaths
People from Nebra (Unstrut)
People from the Province of Saxony
East German male racewalkers
Sportspeople from Saxony-Anhalt
Olympic athletes of the United Team of Germany
Athletes (track and field) at the 1956 Summer Olympics
Athletes (track and field) at the 1960 Summer Olympics
Athletes (track and field) at the 1964 Summer Olympics
Olympic silver medalists for the United Team of Germany
European Athletics Championships medalists
Medalists at the 1964 Summer Olympics
Olympic silver medalists in athletics (track and field)
Recipients of the Patriotic Order of Merit in bronze
World Athletics Race Walking Team Championships winners